Guess Who is a 2005 American comedy film directed by Kevin Rodney Sullivan. It is a loose remake of Guess Who's Coming to Dinner, a 1967 film about a black man marrying a white woman. This film instead focuses on a black woman marrying a white man. The film stars Bernie Mac, Ashton Kutcher, and Zoë Saldaña.

The majority of the film was filmed in Cranford, New Jersey.

Plot 
Theresa Jones takes her boyfriend, Simon Green, to her parents' home to meet them on their 25th wedding anniversary, planning to reveal that the couple are engaged. However, Theresa has neglected to mention that Simon is white. Theresa's father, Percy, dislikes Simon almost immediately not only because of his race, but also because he lies to him about being on the NASCAR pit crew for Jeff Gordon, not realizing that Percy is one of Gordon's biggest fans. Percy also happens to stumble on Simon jokingly wearing Theresa's lingerie while the couple is playing around in her childhood bedroom. None of this helps endear Simon to Percy. 

After catching Theresa and Simon in the bedroom, Percy tries to force Simon into a hotel, but all the hotels in town are booked. Instead, Percy allows Simon to sleep in his basement on the couch, where Percy also sleeps so he can keep an eye on him.

With the help of his personal assistant Reggie, Percy tries to learn as much information about Simon as he can as well as creating the ideal black boyfriend for Theresa instead of revealing her boyfriend is white. Reggie manages to convince Simon to reveal that he lied about being a NASCAR pit crew member and also that he needs a $50,000 loan. Simon discovers Percy's lies just as Reggie reveals that Simon quit his job. Immediately, Percy goes to tell Theresa this new information; however, Simon claims he was not fired and instead quit. Furious that he did not tell her the truth, Theresa leaves while Percy's spying and plagiarism of his vows temporarily strains his relationship with his wife, Marilyn.

The next morning, Percy and Simon find Marilyn and Theresa to apologize. While Marilyn and Percy reconcile, Simon and Theresa break up and he leaves. On the day of his anniversary, Theresa tells her father that she and Simon were intending to marry. After wondering why a man intending to get married would quit his job, Percy realizes that Simon quit his job due to his boss' disapproval of interracial relationships. Percy pursues Simon and brings him back to Theresa, and they reconcile.

Cast 
 Bernie Mac as Percy Jones
 Judith Scott as Marilyn Jones, Percy's wife
 Zoë Saldaña as Theresa Jones, Percy & Marilyn's daughter and Simon's girlfriend
 Ashton Kutcher as Simon Green, Theresa's boyfriend
 Hal Williams as Howard Jones, Percy's father
 Kellee Stewart as Keisha Jones, Percy & Marilyn's daughter
 Lawrence Hilton-Jacobs as Joseph Jones
 Sherri Shepherd as Sydney
 Robert Curtis Brown as Dante
 RonReaco Lee as Reggie
 Phil Reeves as Fred
 Nicole Sullivan as Liz Klein
 Jessica Cauffiel as Polly
 Niecy Nash as Naomi
 Kimberly Scott as Kimdra
 Denise Dowse as Lisa
 Richard Lawson as Marcus

Production 
The film's working title was The Dinner Party.  At one point, Harold Ramis was slated to direct.

Reception

Box office 
According to Box Office Mojo, the film earned $68,915,888 domestically and another $32,950,142 internationally, giving it a total gross of $101,866,030 worldwide.

Critical reception 
Guess Who received mixed reviews. Review aggregator Rotten Tomatoes gives the film a rating of 42%, based on 151 reviews, with an average rating of 5.41/10. The site's consensus reads: "Despite the chemistry of its stars, Guess Who, a loose remake of Guess Who's Coming to Dinner, lacks the political relevance of the original."

USA Today said of the film, "A succession of tired race jokes made worse by the bad comedic timing of the bland, under-talented Ashton Kutcher", The Wall Street Journal said, "Guess Who is, impurely and simply, a comic premise borrowed, turned around and dumbed down to the level of sketch or sub-sketch humour" and Rolling Stone said, "Guess what? It's almost bearable".

More positive reviews included The Baltimore Sun, which said, "The movie's sweetness, wit and charm go beyond its can't-we-all-just-get-along premise".

See also 
 Something New

References

External links 

 
 
 
 

2000s buddy comedy films
2005 romantic comedy films
2005 films
20th Century Fox films
Columbia Pictures films
Regency Enterprises films
Films about interracial romance
American buddy comedy films
Remakes of American films
American romantic comedy films
2000s English-language films
Films scored by John Murphy (composer)
Films directed by Kevin Rodney Sullivan
Films set in New Jersey
Films shot in New Jersey
Films with screenplays by Peter Tolan
African-American comedy films
African-American films
3 Arts Entertainment films
2000s American films